The Girl Is in Trouble is a 2015 American thriller film directed by Julius Onah. It stars Columbus Short, Wilmer Valderrama, Alicja Bachleda and Jesse Spencer. The original motion picture soundtrack contains the theme song titled "Solitude". The film was released theatrically and on VOD on April 3, 2015.

Plot

August, a Lower East Side bartender, becomes entangled in a murder mystery involving Signe, a desperate woman, Angel, the brother of Jesus, a missing drug dealer and Nicholas, the scion of a powerful investment firm.

Cast
Columbus Short as August
Wilmer Valderrama as Angel
Alicja Bachleda as Signe
Jesse Spencer as Nicholas
Paz de la Huerta as Maria
Míriam Colón as Grandma
Mike Starr as Fixer
Tom Pelphrey as Eric
Kareem Savinon as Jesus
Wass Stevens as Freddy
J. Bernard Calloway as Dre
Omer Barnea as Amir
Jamie Miller as Young Signe

Reception
The review aggregator website Rotten Tomatoes reported a 57% approval rating with an average rating of 5.9/10 based on 14 reviews. On Metacritic, the film achieved an average score of 55 out of 100 based on 9 reviews.

References

External links

2015 films
2015 thriller films
Films directed by Julius Onah
Films set in New York City
2015 directorial debut films
American thriller films
2010s English-language films
2010s American films